Poddar Prem or Padmar Prem (also known as Padmar Bhalobasha) is a Bangladeshi full-length drama film released in 2019. The film tells the story of the life of a villager on the banks of the river Padma in the 1970s. The film is written, scripted and directed by Harun-uz-Zaman. The film is produced by Mohammad Shah Alam under the banner of Swapnachura Film International. The film is simultaneously made in Bengali , Oriya and Bhojpuri languages . On September 20, 2019, the film was released in West Bengal , India .

References

2010s Bengali-language films